Wakeboarding HD is a sports video game developed and published by Creat Studios exclusively for the PlayStation 3.

Reception

Wakeboarding HD received "mixed or average" reviews, according to review aggregator Metacritic.

References

External links
 

2010 video games
Multiplayer and single-player video games
PlayStation 3 games
PlayStation 3-only games
PlayStation Network games
Video games developed in the United States
Water sports video games
Wakeboarding
TikGames games